Baltasar Jaime Martínez Compañón (1737–1797) was a Spanish prelate who served as Bishop of Trujillo, Peru, Peru from 1779 to 1790, at Trujillo Cathedral, and Archbishop of Bogotá, New Granada, from 1790 to 1797. He was responsible for founding new towns, building schools, and reforming the silver mine at Hualgayoc. He is most remarkable for his efforts to educate Trujillo's Indians and for his research into local plants, animals, archaeological ruins, music, and native cultures.

Background and education 
Martínez Compañón was born in Cabredo, Navarre (Spain) and studied Religious Law at the Universities of Huesca and Zaragosa in Aragón before earning his bachelor's degree at the University of Oñate in Guipuzcoa in 1759, and his doctorate at Oñate in 1763. He was ordained as a Catholic priest in 1761. In 1766, he served as an advisor to the Holy Office of the Inquisition in Madrid.

Early career in America 
In 1767, King Charles III of Spain named Martínez Compañón choirmaster of the Metropolitan Cathedral of Lima, Peru. In 1772 and 1773, he served as Secretary to the Sixth Provincial Church Council of Peru, held in Lima. From 1770 to 1778, he served as rector of the Saint Toribio seminary, also in Lima.

Bishop of Trujillo 
King Charles III named Martínez Compañón Bishop of Trujillo, Peru, on February 25, 1778. While there, he explored his bishopric in a visitation that lasted two years, eight months, and eight days. During this time he gathered the information that would become the basis of his projects to found new towns and schools. He planned to create special schools for Indian boys and girls where they would learn trade and craft skills as well as basic literacy. He also imagined an elaborate plan to create a utopian mining town at the Hualgayoc silver mine, outside Cajamarca.

Archbishop of Bogotá 

After arriving in Bogotá  on March 12, 1791, Martínez Compañón repaired local churches, founded five primary schools throughout the city, and established a seminary. He also became friends with noted botanist José Celestino Mutis.

Death 
Martínez Compañón died of old age on August 17, 1797. Local legend holds that a smell of flowers emanated from his corpse and for three days the sun did not shine.

Legacy 
When Martínez Compañón died, he left behind a natural history collection of animals, plants, artifacts and manufactures. These comprised a total of 24 boxes. Today part of the collection is held at the Museo de América in Madrid, although the majority of it has been lost. He also sent to Spain a nine volume set of watercolor images depicting the people, plants, and animals of Trujillo, the Codex Martínez Compañón. Drawn by local artisans, these 1,372 images are a unique example of vernacular natural history produced in the colonial context. The originals survive today in the library of the Royal Palace in Madrid.

References 

 Emily Berquist, The Bishop's Utopia: Imagining Improvement in Colonial Peru. University of Pennsylvania Press, March 2014.
 Emily Berquist, “Bishop Martínez Compañón's Practical Utopia in Enlightenment Peru,”  The Americas: A Quarterly Review of Inter-American Cultural History 64, no. 3 (January 2008): 377–408.
 Emily Berquist, “The Science of Empire: Bishop Martínez Compañón and the Enlightenment in Peru.” Ph.D. Dissertation, University of Texas at Austin, 2007
 José Manuel Pérez Ayala, Baltasar Jaime Martínez Compañón y Bujanda, Prelado Español de Colombia y el Perú. Bogotá: Imprenta Nacional, 1955.
 J. Navarro, et al., eds. Vida y Obra del Obispo Martínez Compañón. Piura: Universidad de Piura, 1991.
 Joanne Pillsbury and Lisa Trever, "The King, the Bishop, and the Creation of an American Antiquity," Ñawpa Pacha 29 (2008.)
 Joanne Pillsbury and Lisa Trever, "Martínez Compañón and His Illustrated 'Museum," in Collecting Across Cultures: Material Exchanges in the Early Modern Atlantic World, Peter C. Mancall and Daniela Bleichmar, eds. Philadelphia: University of Pennsylvania Press, 2011.
 Daniel Restrepo, Sociedad y Religión en Trujillo (Peru) Bajo el Episcopado de Baltasar Jaime Martínez Compañón, 1780–1790. Vitoria-Gaistez: Servicio Central de Publicaciones, Gobierno Vasco, 1992.
 Ruben Vargas Ugarte, Tres Figuras Señeras del Episcopado Americano. Lima: Carlos Milla Batres, 1966.
 Adrián Rodríguez Van der Spoel, "Bailes, Tonadas & Cachuas. The music of the 18th century Codex Trujillo del Perú. Deuss Music, The Hague, 2013

External links 
 Catholic Hierarchy Information

Spanish Roman Catholic bishops in South America
Colonial Peru
Trujillo, Peru
1737 births
1797 deaths
People from Lower Navarre
18th-century Peruvian people
Roman Catholic bishops of Trujillo